The 2018–19 Port Vila Premier League is the 25th season of the Port Vila Premier League, the top football league in Port Vila, the capital of Vanuatu. The season started on 27 October 2018. Tupuji Imere are the defending champions.

Teams
A total of eight teams compete in the league. Sia-Raga and Mauwia were relegated from last season, and were replaced by promoted teams Galaxy and Yatel.
Amicale
Erakor Golden Star
Galaxy
Ifira Black Bird
Shepherds United
Tafea
Tupuji Imere
Yatel

League table

Results 

 - Ifira Black Bird won the match (1-0) but three points were given to Tafea because Ifira Black Bird fielded ineligible players.

PVFA Top Four Super League
The top four teams of the Port Vila Premier League play in the Top Four Super League for a place in the OFC Champions League.

Grand Final Qualifier

Semifinal Qualifier

Semifinal

Grand Final
Winner of the Grand Final qualifies for the 2020 OFC Champions League group stage and the 2019 VFF National Super League grand final.

See also
2019 VFF National Super League

References

Port Vila Football League seasons
Vanuatu, Port Vila
Vanuatu, Port Vila
2018–19 in Vanuatuan football